Octopus4 is the second studio album by the electronic band The Algorithm. It was released in 2014 on Basick Records.

Track listing

Personnel
 Rémi Gallego — synthesizer, sequencer, guitar, programming, producer, vocals 
 Mike Malyan — drums
 Tim Reynolds — mastering

References

2014 albums
The Algorithm albums
Albums produced by Rémi Gallego
Basick Records albums